DNA-directed RNA polymerase II subunit RPB4 is an enzyme that in humans is encoded by the POLR2D gene.

This gene encodes the fourth-largest subunit of RNA polymerase II, the polymerase responsible for synthesizing messenger RNA in eukaryotes. In yeast, this polymerase subunit is associated with the polymerase under suboptimal growth conditions and may have a stress protective role. A sequence for a ribosomal pseudogene is contained within the 3' untranslated region of the transcript from this gene.

References

Further reading